Amari  may refer to:
 Amari Province, Greece
 Amari Valley and town in Crete, Greece
 Amari (municipality) in Crete, Greece
 Amari, Khuzestan, Iran
 Amari, Nepal
 Ämari, Estonia
 Amari Hotels and Resorts
 Mikhail Tsetlin, Russian poet and editor, writing under the pseudonym Amari
 Amari (name)
 Amari (group), an R&B group
 "Amari" (song), a song by J. Cole
 Plural of amaro, a liqueur

See also
Amare (disambiguation)
Ameri (disambiguation)